Clara Klug (born 16 June 1994) is a German visually impaired cross-country skier and biathlete. She made her Paralympic debut at the 2018 Winter Paralympics for Germany. Klug claimed a bronze medal in the women's 10km visually impaired biathlon event as a part of the 2018 Winter Paralympics.

References

External links 
 
 
  

1994 births
Living people
German female biathletes
German female cross-country skiers
Biathletes at the 2018 Winter Paralympics
Cross-country skiers at the 2018 Winter Paralympics
Paralympic biathletes of Germany
Paralympic cross-country skiers of Germany
Paralympic bronze medalists for Germany
Medalists at the 2018 Winter Paralympics
Visually impaired category Paralympic competitors
German blind people
Paralympic medalists in biathlon
21st-century German women